Devil Mountain, sometimes mistakenly called Devil's Mountain, is a wooded mountain in the Municipality of Temagami, Northeastern Ontario, Canada. From here, Maple Mountain can be seen on a clear day.

See also
Mount Ferguson

References

External links

Landforms of Temagami
Mountains of Ontario
Mountains of Canada under 1000 metres